Ray Stewart (23 February 1892 – 30 March 1966) was an Australian rules footballer who played with Richmond and Carlton in the Victorian Football League (VFL).

Notes

External links 
		
Ray Stewart's profile at Blueseum		
 

1892 births
1966 deaths
Australian rules footballers from Victoria (Australia)
Richmond Football Club players
Carlton Football Club players
Williamstown Football Club players